The Salmson-Béchereau SB-7 was a fighter aircraft built by the French company Salmson in the mid-1920s.

Design
The SB-7 was a high-wing monoplane of all-wood construction, with a canvas coating. Only one aircraft was built, and it was intended as a navalized SB-5.

Specifications

References

1920s French airliners
SB-7
Single-engined tractor aircraft
High-wing aircraft